Corcoran is a neighborhood within the Powderhorn community in Minneapolis, Minnesota, United States. The neighborhood is bordered by Longfellow and Howe neighborhoods to the east, Phillips to the north, Powderhorn Park to the west and Standish to the south. Its official boundaries are East Lake Street to the north, Hiawatha Avenue to the east, East 36th Street to the south, and Cedar Avenue to the west.

Corcoran is home to Minneapolis South High School.

The seasonal Midtown Farmers' Market, a project of the Corcoran Neighborhood Organization, operates weekly on a site in the neighborhood.

The Corcoran neighborhood is  known for its public art and strong sense of community among neighbors.

References

External links
 Minneapolis Neighborhood Profile - Corcoran
 Corcoran Neighborhood Organization
 Virtual tour of the Corcoran neighborhood

Neighborhoods in Minneapolis